Jan Krawczyk (10 June 1956 – 14 July 2018) was a Polish former racing cyclist. He was ranked third in 1979 Tour de Pologne.

References

Bibliography
 Bogdan Tuszyński, Złota księga kolarstwa polskiego, Publisher: Polska Oficyna Wydawnicza "BGW", Warsaw, 1995

External links
 Jan Krawczyk on Polish Wikipedia
 Jan Krawczyk on Portuguese Wikipedia

1956 births
2018 deaths
Polish male cyclists
People from Radomsko County
Sportspeople from Łódź Voivodeship